The Glasshouse Hotel in Edinburgh, Scotland, opened in June 2003 and is located on Greenside Place, next to the Playhouse Theatre. The hotel is on the edge of Edinburgh's New Town build into the 160-year-old façade of Lady Glenorchy Church. The hotel has 77 bedrooms (of which 20 are suites, all named after a specific brand of whisky) and two acre roof garden, overlooking Calton Hill.

References

External links 
 
 Autograph Collection Hotels

Hotels in Edinburgh
Glass architecture
2003 establishments in Scotland
Hotels established in 2003